Zeist is a municipality in the Utrecht province of the Netherlands.

Population centers 

 Zeist (seat)
 Austerlitz
 Bosch en Duin
 Den Dolder
 Huis ter Heide
 Sterrenberg

Neighboring municipalities 

 De Bilt (municipality)
 Amersfoort (municipality)
 Baarn (municipality)
 Bunnik (municipality)
 Soest (municipality)
 Leusden (municipality)
 Utrecht (municipality)
 Utrechtse Heuvelrug (municipality)
 Woudenberg (municipality)

See also 

 Zeist
 Utrecht
 Utrecht (province)
 Utrecht (municipality)
 Flag of Zeist

References 

Municipalities of Utrecht (province)